Ozzano Monferrato is a comune (municipality) in the Province of Alessandria in the Italian region Piedmont, located about  east of Turin and about  northwest of Alessandria.

Ozzano Monferrato borders the following municipalities: Casale Monferrato, Cella Monte, Cereseto, Pontestura, Rosignano Monferrato, Sala Monferrato, San Giorgio Monferrato, and Treville.

Main sights
Parish church
Church of Santa Maria Assunta
Small church of San Giovanni Battista
Church of San Salvatore
Castle

References

Cities and towns in Piedmont